The Port O' Plymouth Museum, located in Plymouth, North Carolina contains many artifacts from the American Civil War.  A replica of the CSS Albemarle is also located behind the museum in the Roanoke River.

The museum is operated by the Washington County Historical Society.

References 

History museum
Museums in Washington County, North Carolina